Freek Vrugtman (6 July 1927 – 3 March 2022) was a Canadian botanist and horticulturist. Vrugtman was Curator at both University of British Columbia Botanical Garden in Vancouver, British Columbia, and Royal Botanical Gardens (RBG) in Burlington, Ontario, Canada. For 45 years he served as the International Registrar for Hybrid Cultivars of Lilacs in the Genus Syringa.

Early life
Vrugtman was born on 6 July 1927 in Rotterdam, The Netherlands. His early education was interrupted by World War II. After the war he apprenticed at a tree nursery and then trained in gardening in Germany. He emigrated to Canada in 1952 and first worked on a farm in Donegal, Ontario and then as a gardener at Manitoba’s Morden Research and Development Centre. He crisscrossed the country to follow opportunities, becoming a nurseryman in Ocean Park, British Columbia, a gardener at the Dominion Arboretum in Ottawa, Ontario, and a landscape foreman for a paper mill in Quebec.

Education
Vrugtman completed a Bachelor of Science and Arts (BSA) degree at University of British Columbia in 1963 with a major in ornamental horticulture and plant taxonomy. He earned his Master of Science degree at Cornell University in Ithaca, New York.

Career
Vrugtman was appointed Curator of the University of British Columbia Botanic Garden in 1956. Following studies in the US and Europe with his wife Ina (née van Teunenbroek), he joined the staff of Royal Botanical Gardens in Hamilton and Burlington, Ontario in February 1968 as the first Curator of Collections, with responsibility for the horticultural collections and gardens, and their expansion, taxonomy and documentation. He paid particular attention to woody plant collections. The Lilac collection in the Katie Osborne Lilac Garden had just been moved to the RBG Arboretum and expanded thanks to a legacy gift from Hamilton businessman Colin Osborne in memory of his wife Katie.

Working with RBG's other staff, including Charles Holetich and Dr. Leslie Laking, Vrugtman directed considerable attention to the collection and was appointed the International Registrar for Lilacs in the Genus Syringa in 1976, as RBG was named the International Cultivar Registration Authority (ICRA) for Lilacs. Whenever a new cultivar was bred anywhere in the world the breeder would submit a request to the Registrar entry into the International Registry. Vrugtman would review all such applications and guide the breeder through the process. As Registrar he became widely known as the international expert on Lilac cultivars, as well as serving as Registrar for Cultivar Names for Unassigned Woody Genera.

Vrugtman's professional service to horticultural science spread far beyond Lilacs, and beyond RBG. He participated in dozens of initiatives within horticultural science and botanical gardens and helped edit several editions of the International Code of Nomenclature for Cultivated Plants (ICNCP). He was also a part-time lecturer for landscape architecture courses at the University of Toronto and undertook research and advised other institutions in Germany, China, and the Philippines.

Following retirement in 1992 Vrugtman was named RBG's Curator Emeritus, and received several awards from the International Society for Horticultural Science (ISHA) and the International Lilac Society (ILS) as well as the 1993 Award of Merit from the American Public Gardens Association. He continued to serve as International Registrar as a volunteer, finally handing off the role the ILS in May 2019. Vrugtman also undertook a major revision of John Fiala's classic book Lilacs: A Gardener’s Encyclopedia, published in 2008 by Timber Press. Vrugtman passed away in Hamilton, Ontario, Canada in 2022.

Awards and honors
 1962 W. Jack H. Dicks Bursary, University of British Columbia
 1963 Biely-Coulthard Trophy, University of British Columbia
 1963 Vancouver Natural History Society Prize, Vancouver Natural History Society (now Nature Vancouver)
 1964 Elected member of Pi Alpha Xi, Alpha Chapter, National Honorary Fraternity in Floriculture and Ornamental Horticulture, Cornell University
 1966/67 William F. Dreer Travelling Scholarship, Cornell University  
 1966/67 International Agricultural Centre Fellowship, Wageningen, The Netherlands
 1967 British Council Grant, United Kingdom
 1967 Deutscher akademischer Austauschdienst Grant, Federal Republic of Germany  
 1974 Deutscher akademischer Austauschdienst Fellowship, Federal Republic of Germany
 1993 Award of Merit, American Association of Botanical Gardens and Arboreta (now American Public Gardens Association) 
 1997 Directors Award, International Lilac Society
 2000 Honors & Achievement Award, International Lilac Society
 2002 ISHS Medal, International Society for Horticultural Science
 2019 Lifetime Achievement Award, International Lilac Society

Bibliography

References

20th-century Canadian botanists
21st-century Canadian botanists
Cornell University alumni